In 2008, Los Del Rio released Quinceañera Macarena, a quinceañera themed album to commemorate the fifteenth birthday of their #1 hit single "Macarena".  The album featured performances by Jon Secada, Oscar D'Leon, T. Lopez, The DEY and Barullo.

The AOS Mix of Macarena featuring T. Lopez, Yeyo (The DEY) and el Chino DreadLion was produced by The Art of Sound  and released in November 2008 by IMC records, thru Universal Music Latin in the U.S., the remake received moderate airplay on some Spanish music stations, such as WSKQ-FM, KVVZ, and WMEG and peaked in Top 25 of the Latin Billboard charts.

Track listing
 Macarena - (Bayside Boys Mix, featuring T. Lopez/Yeyo "The DEY"/El Chino)
 Mi Gitana - (featuring The D.E.Y.)
 Miami Miami - (featuring El Chino)
 Canto, La - (featuring Jon Secada)
 Mazukamba - (featuring Oscar D'León)
 Chambalada - (featuring El Barullo)
 Melocoton
 Siempre Vuelvo a Mi Camino
 Roberto y Natalia
 Macarena - (featuring Oscar D'León)

Personnel
Germán Ortiz (acoustic guitar, tres, ukulele, keyboards, programming, drum programming); Juan Pablo Diaz (acoustic guitar); Marc G. Quintilla (electric guitar); John Lozano (accordion); Manuel Gonzalez (trombone); Lasim Richards (brass).Audio Mixers: Dave Junco; Germán Ortiz. Recording information: South Beach Studios, Miami Beach, FL; Studio Marc Kondrat, Miami, FL; Studios Lujan Dyango, Barcelona, Spain.Arrangers: Germán Ortiz; Jesus Hidalgo.

Contributing Artists: Jon Secada, Oscar D'Leon, Yeyo, El Barullo, El Chino, T. Opez, The D.E.Y., T. Lopez
Producer: Germán Ortiz, Jesus Hidalgo
Distributor: Universal Music Latino

References

http://www.thefreelibrary.com/Adios+JLo+and+Hello+TLo+-+The+New+Macarena+is+Cash+Money+Records%27...-a0193451843

2008 albums
Los del Río albums